The Bulgaria national rugby union team is governed by the Bulgarian Rugby Federation, and has yet to qualify for the Rugby World Cup.

The national side is ranked 66th in the world (as of 4 April 2022).

History

Bulgaria played their first rugby international in 1963, where they met Romania. They were defeated by the Romanians, 70-3. There was no qualifying tournament held for the first Rugby World Cup, and Bulgaria did not attempt to qualify for the tournament until the Welsh hosted the 1999 Rugby World Cup. They competed in Pool 2 of Round A, but did not advance to the next stage.

Bulgaria again tried to qualify for the 2003 Rugby World Cup in Australia, and competed in Pool B of Round 1. Although Bulgaria won one pool match, they did not advance to Round 2. For the 2007 Rugby World Cup, Bulgaria were able to advance past Round 1, and entered Pool D of Round 2. However, they were then knocked out of the qualifying tournament.

World Cup record

Recent Squad

Previous squad 
Squad to 2019 European Nations Cup - Division 2D.

Georgi Gidionov
Dimo Dimov
Dimitar Georgiev 
Vladi Mihov
Alex Tenev
Tsvetomir Stoyanov
Iliya Krastev 
Nikolay Hinov 
Denis Ivanov
Borislav Borisov
Kostadin Petkov
Vasil Borisov
Petar Nikolov (c)
Tsvetostin Tsvetkov
Ivailo Petrov
Ivailo Ivanov
Kristian Kotsev
Kristian Pavlov
Ricardo Attye
Tsvetan Rashev
Hristo Georgiev
Smilko Debrenliev
Deyan Parvanov
Dimitar Kotsev
Victor Iliev

See also
 Rugby union in Bulgaria

External links
 RugbyBulgaria.com Сайтът за Ръгби в България
 Bulgaria national rugby union team Fixtures and Results
 Bulgaria on "World Rugby"
 Bulgaria  on RugbyData.com
 Murphy's Misfits Social Rugby in Bulgaria
 Barbarians Sofia Barbarians Sofia Rugby Club

References

Teams in European Nations Cup (rugby union)
European national rugby union teams
Rugby union in Bulgaria
Rugby union